The General Confederation of the Kingdom of Poland (28 June 1812 – 30 April 1813, Polish Konfederacja Generalna Królestwa Polskiego) was a Polish confederation established by emperor Napoleon Bonaparte on the eve of his campaign in Russia.

It was formally founded by the Sejm of the Duchy of Warsaw on 28 June 1812. It re-established a form of government very similar to the former Polish–Lithuanian Commonwealth. The Marshal of the General Council of Confederation was named Adam Kazimierz Czartoryski.

Its goal was to introduce Polish administration in the Russian territories of what is today Lithuania, Belarus and Ukraine following their occupation by Napoleon's Grande Armée. The confederation ceased to exist on 30 April 1813.

Gallery

References

Bibliography
 Diariusz Sejmowy z roku 1812, "Teki Archiwalne", t. 21, 1989, pp. 146–152
 A. Rembowski, Konfederacja Generalna i pospolite ruszenie w roku 1812, "Biblioteka Warszawska", t. 1, 1896, z. 3, pp. 478–514, t. 2, 1896, z. 1, pp. 67–86
 Marian Kukiel, Wojna 1812 roku, Kraków 1937

Polish confederations
1812 in Poland
Duchy of Warsaw
French invasion of Russia
Kingdom of Poland
1810s establishments in Poland
1812 establishments in Europe
1813 disestablishments in Poland
States and territories established in 1812
States and territories disestablished in 1813